Oceanian Americans or Oceanic Americans are Americans whose ancestors came from Oceania, a region which is composed of the Australian continent and the Pacific Islands.

There are basically two Oceanian American groups, that well represent the racial and cultural population of Oceania: Euro-Oceanian Americans (Australian Americans and New Zealand Americans) and the indigenous peoples of Oceania in the United States or Pacific Islander Americans (Chamorro Americans, Samoan Americans, etc.) Most of the Euro-Oceanians are descended from the European settlers in Oceania; while Pacific Islanders are of indigenous Oceanian descent.

Oceanian Americans in the 2000 and 2010 United States censuses 
Oceanian Americans in the 2000 and 2010 U.S. censuses:

References